An engine house is a building that holds engines, often stationary engines providing power, and sometimes is a fire station holding fire engines.

Engine House or variations such as Engine House No. X, may also refer to:

United States
 Engine House No. 18 (Los Angeles, California) 
 Engine House No. 31, an engine house in San Francisco, California 
 Mechanics Engine House No. 4, Macon, Georgia
 Engine House No. 3 (Fort Wayne, Indiana) 
 Valley Junction-West Des Moines City Hall and Engine House, West Des Moines, Iowa
 Engine House No. 6 (Wichita, Kansas) 
 Engine House (Auburn, Maine)
 Monson Engine House, Monson, Maine
 Old City Hall and Engine House, Annapolis, Maryland
 Engine House No. 6 (Baltimore, Maryland) 
 Engine House No. 8 (Baltimore, Maryland) 
 Engine House No. 34, an engine house in Boston, Massachusetts 
 Engine House No. 6 (Lawrence, Massachusetts) 
 Weir Engine House, Taunton, Massachusetts
 Engine House No. 11 (Detroit)
 Engine House No. 18 (Detroit) 
Cleveland Mine Engine House Number 3, Ishpeming, Michigan
 Engine House No. 3 (Kalamazoo, Michigan) 
 Winona and St. Peter Engine House, Winona, Minnesota
 Fort Benton Engine House, Fort Benton, Montana
 Engine House No. 3, Truck No. 2, an engine house in Hoboken, New Jersey 
 Engine House No. 28, an engine house in Buffalo, New York 
 Niagara Engine House, Poughkeepsie, New York
Engine House No. 7 (Columbus, Ohio), on Columbus Register of Historic Properties
 Engine House No. 16, an engine house in Columbus, Ohio 
 Engine House No. 1 (Sandusky, Ohio), an engine house in Sandusky, Ohio
 Engine House No. 3 (Sandusky, Ohio) 
 Waynesville Engine House and Lockup, Waynesville, Ohio
 Engine House No. 4 (Tacoma, Washington) 
 Engine House No. 8 (Tacoma, Washington) 
 Engine House No. 9, an engine house in Tacoma, Washington  
 Engine House No. 11 (Tacoma, Washington), an engine house
 Engine House No. 13, an engine house in Tacoma, Washington 
Engine House No. 7 (Washington, D.C.)
 Engine House No. 10, an engine house in Washington, D.C.
 Omro Village Hall and Engine House, Omro, Wisconsin
 Tigerton Village Hall and Engine House, Tigerton, Wisconsin

Other countries
 The Engine House, a railway education centre in Shropshire, England

See also
 List of fire stations
Engine House No. 3 (disambiguation)
Engine House No. 4 (disambiguation)
Engine House No. 6 (disambiguation)
Engine House No. 7 (disambiguation)
Engine House No. 8 (disambiguation)
Engine House No. 11 (disambiguation)